The Chehel Dokhtaran mausoleum is a historical structure in Kashan, Iran. It is located to the west of Emamzadeh Soltan Mir Ahmad. The mausoleum was built in the Ilkhanid era. Its high simple unadorned dome is the hallmark of the architecture in the Ilkhanid era.

Etymology 
Chehel Dokhtaran means forty girls in the Persian language, but it is unknown for what reason this name has been given to the building. Some people believe that this building had been a mosque and school special to women just like Chehel Dokhtaran minaret and it was built like the minaret in 1112.

See also 
List of the historical structures in the Isfahan province

References 

Architecture in Iran
Buildings and structures in Kashan
Mausoleums in Iran